Empower is an advertising and marketing agency headquartered in Cincinnati, Ohio, founded in 1985 by Mary Beth Price. It was the 49th largest private employer in the Cincinnati region in 2019, having dropped from 36th in 2007.

History

It was founded by Mary Beth Price in Cincinnati in 1985. Her son Jim Price has been the CEO since 2009. Mary Beth’s son, Jim Price has been the CEO since 2009. Mary Price sold the company to her son in 2019 as part of the succession plan, but remains a board member. It was the largest woman-owned company in the region until the sale. It was the 49th largest private employer in the Cincinnati region in 2019, having dropped from 36th in 2007. It has declined to allow the Cincinnati Enquirer to release its revenue for the Deloitte.

References

Advertising agencies of the United States
Digital marketing